Stars and Stripes Forever is a 1952 American Technicolor film biography of the late-19th-/early-20th-century composer and band leader John Philip Sousa. This 20th Century Fox feature was produced by Lamar Trotti, directed by Henry Koster, and stars Clifton Webb, Debra Paget, Robert Wagner, and Ruth Hussey. The film's title is taken from Sousa's "The Stars and Stripes Forever", which has become the best known of his military marches. The film was released twenty years after Sousa's death.

While the film's storyline is loosely based on Sousa's autobiography Marching Along, the film takes considerable liberties and dramatic license, often expanding and examining themes and passages from Sousa's book. Two examples: In the film, Private Willie Little (Robert Wagner), is credited with inventing the Sousaphone and naming it after his mentor, but in reality Sousa himself designed the instrument. The inspiration for the film's title march is depicted in a scene with a voice over by Webb quoting Sousa's actual description of its creation while he was aboard ship recovering from typhoid fever. In reality, having learned of the sudden death of his band's manager, Sousa and his wife canceled their European vacation and were returning to the U.S. by steamship when the march came to him.

Plot
In the 1890s, Sergeant Major John Philip Sousa, the director of the United States Marine Band, leaves the Marine Corps after his enlistment expires to form his own band. He must do so because he is not paid enough by the Corps to provide for his wife Jennie (Ruth Hussey) and their three children. As a favor for his splendid service, he is allowed to take along Private Willie Little (Robert Wagner), who has invented and plays a new instrument, the "Sousaphone".

Willie persuades Sousa to go with him to a "concert" where some of Sousa's songs will be performed. In fact, it is a rowdy music hall, where Willie's girlfriend, Lily Becker (Debra Paget), is one of the performers. When the police raid the place for indecency (by 1890s standards), the trio barely manage to get away. Willie and Lily immediately begin to fit right in, eventually becoming an extension of the Sousa family.

Sousa forms his band and selects only the finest musicians from around the world. He firmly discourages the married men in the band from bringing their wives along on tour. However, Willie and Lily are deeply in love and are secretly married and tour together in the new band. Late one night, Sousa is shocked when he spots Willie sneaking into Lily's train compartment. Sousa's wife has to let him in on their secret.

Sousa's contract to perform at the Atlanta, Georgia Cotton States and International Exposition in 1895 is canceled by Colonel Randolph (Finlay Currie) because both previous bands proved to be unpopular at the exposition. Sousa heads south anyway. His musicians strike up "Dixie" as the band marches onto the exposition grounds, putting the large crowd in a jubilant, receptive mood. The playlist for Sousa's twice-daily concerts is announced, and it includes "Dixie", to be played as often as possible and for all encores. Sousa and his band are heartily welcomed to the Atlanta exposition. Sousa then surprises the otherwise all-white audience by introducing a black choral group called the Stone Mountain Church Choir of Atlanta, to sing the Battle Hymn of the Republic.

Sousa and his band tour the world, and he is honored with medals by the crowned heads of Europe. However, Sousa is kept out of the actual fighting and instead is forced to go on a sea voyage to recover from a bout of typhoid fever. At sea, he begins a new march inspired by the war.

During the rehearsal of Sousa's new operetta El Capitan, starring Lily, the Sousas receive a letter from Willie in Cuba in which he reveals he was wounded in the knee (his lower left leg is later amputated). Following the end of the war, Willie returns home and recuperates at the Brooklyn Navy Yard Hospital. Willie and Lily attend a small weekly concert held at the hospital. As a surprise, the curtain opens and Sousa and his 50-piece band are revealed. Sousa calls upon Willie to rejoin them on his Sousaphone in a concert for the wounded veterans, their families, and the medical staff. Sousa announces that he has written a new march for all the veterans of the war and that this performance will be its debut.

The band launches into the film's title march, as we move forward in time to the present day. Battalions of uniformed U.S. Marines march in formation to the martial music. In modern Washington D.C., the ghostly spirit of Sousa leads the United States Marine Band while they perform "The Stars and Stripes Forever" to its rousing conclusion.

Cast
Clifton Webb as John Philip Sousa
Debra Paget as Lily Becker
Robert Wagner as Willie Little
Ruth Hussey as Jennie Sousa
Finlay Currie as Col. Randolph
Roy Roberts as Maj. Houston
Thomas Browne Henry as David Blakely 
Lester Matthews as Mr. Pickering
Maudie Prickett as Maid
Richard Garrick as Secretary of the Navy
Erne Verebes as Organ Grinder 
Roy Gordon as Benjamin Harrison
Florence Shirley as Navy Nurse
Heinie Conklin as  Spectator 
Blue Washington as Spectator 
Casey Adams as Narrator (uncredited)

Reception
Bosley Crowther, film critic for The New York Times, wrote that "This big, brassy Technicolored picture ... is, in substance, a rambling review of the musical triumphs of the famous bandmaster, whom Clifton Webb regally plays. And as such, it is much more rewarding in its thumpings and boomings of a rousing band than it is in its illuminations of personalities or plot".

At the film review aggregator website Rotten Tomatoes, 84% of 273 users liked the film, giving it an average rating of 3.7/5.

Music
The "Presidential Polonaise", a Sousa composition, may be heard during the White House scene in which the President is hounded by a senator about a postmaster appointment. President Benjamin Harrison sends a request for a more lively piece of music in order to speed up the reception line, and Sousa and his band strike up "Semper Fidelis". Both pieces were specifically written by Sousa for White House functions: the "Presidential Polonaise" for indoor events, "Semper Fidelis" for outdoor functions.

During the "El Capitan" rehearsal, while Sousa reads of Willie's wounding
incident, two rarely heard lyrics can be heard: one to "El Capitan", the march, and a Sousa ballad.

In reality, "The Stars and Stripes Forever" was first played publicly at the Academy of Music in Philadelphia on May 14, 1897, much earlier than the hospital concert depicted at the conclusion of the film. Ninety years later, by a 1987 act of the U.S. Congress, it was made the official National March of the United States of America.

During the overture, which is played over the title credits, there are excerpts from many Sousa marches. The drum solo is a shortened version of the "Semper Fidelis" solo.

Home media
Stars and Stripes Forever was released in 2011 on a combo Blu-ray and DVD 2-disc set from 20th Century Fox Home Entertainment. It also contains two documentaries, "From Our National March to the Silver Screen" and "John Philip Sousa's Contribution to American Music". Also included: the original theatrical trailer and selections from the film's pressbook, advertising, and still photo galleries.

References

External links
 
 
 

1952 films
1950s biographical films
American biographical films
Biographical films about musicians
1950s English-language films
Films scored by Alfred Newman
Films based on biographies
20th Century Fox films
Films with screenplays by Lamar Trotti
Films about composers
Films directed by Henry Koster
Cultural depictions of classical musicians
1950s American films